Murali Nair (born 10 January 1966) is an Indian film director and screenwriter. He has directed eight films since 1993. His film Marana Simhasanam was screened in the Un Certain Regard section at the 1999 Cannes Film Festival where it won the Caméra d'Or.

Filmography
 Tragedy of an Indian Farmer (1993)
 Coronations (1995)
 Oru Neenda Yathra (1996)
 Marana Simhasanam (1999)
 Pattiyude Divasam (2001)
 Arimpara (2003)
 Relax (2003)
 Unni (2006)
 Stories On Human Rights (2008)
 Laadli Laila (virgin goat) (2010)
 Summer Holidays (2013)

References

External links
Official website

1966 births
Living people
Malayalam film directors
Malayalam screenwriters
Film directors from Kerala
20th-century Indian film directors
21st-century Indian film directors
Screenwriters from Kerala
Directors of Caméra d'Or winners